The Thomas J. Autzen House is an historic house located in northeast Portland, Oregon.

The Tudor Revival style house was built in 1927, and was added to the National Register of Historic Places on March 9, 1992.

See also
 Thomas J. Autzen
 National Register of Historic Places listings in Northeast Portland, Oregon

References

External links
 

1927 establishments in Oregon
Alameda, Portland, Oregon
Houses completed in 1927
Houses on the National Register of Historic Places in Portland, Oregon
Tudor Revival architecture in Oregon
Portland Historic Landmarks